is a Japanese manga created by Go Nagai. It was originally serialized in Shueisha's seinen manga magazine Weekly Young Jump from 1991 to 1992 (with a one-shot chapter also published in the summer 1992 issue of Bears Club Natsunogo), with its chapters collected in three tankōbon volumes. Fushosa republished the series in 1997, and continued it with three additional volumes (totaling six volumes) until 1998. The series is unfinished, although Nagai stated in 2007 that it would be resumed the future.

Plot
MazinSaga tells the story of the young Koji Kabuto, a university student who finds himself having to collect the fruit of the researches of his father, a physicist of worldwide reputation who died in mysterious circumstances.

The boy is entrusted with a portentous artifact, Mazinger Z, the Armor of God, an extraordinary shell composed of the Super Spiritual Materia Z. The material, of which the armor is composed and discovered by the father of Koji before his death, gives the powers of a god or a demon: everything depends on the will and the spirit of its user. And the devastating powers of Mazinger Z manifest itself in all its violence when Koji, wearing the armor for the first time, will decree nothing less than the end of the whole planet Earth.

It will be this event that will bring him to move to the planet Mars of the future, to help earth survivors and refugees there, against a frightening and mysterious alien enemy.

Videogame

The manga has a videogame for the Sega Mega Drive with the same name in Asia and Japan. It was called Mazin Saga Mutant Fighter in the US and Mazin Wars in Europe.

References

External links
 MazinSaga at The World of Go Nagai webpage
 MazinSaga at D/visual
 MazinSaga at PaTaTo's Manga DB

Fusosha Publishing manga
Mazinger
Mecha anime and manga
Shueisha manga
Seinen manga